Oregon Caves National Monument and Preserve is a protected area in the northern Siskiyou Mountains of southwestern Oregon in the United States. The 4,554-acre (1,843 ha) park, including the marble cave, is 20 miles (32 km) east of Cave Junction, on Oregon Route 46. The protected area, managed by the National Park Service (NPS), is in southwestern Josephine County, near the Oregon–California border.

Elijah Davidson, a resident of nearby Williams, discovered the cave in 1874. Over the next two decades, private investors failed in efforts to run successful tourist ventures at the publicly owned site. After passage of the Antiquities Act by the United States Congress, in 1909 President William Howard Taft established Oregon Caves National Monument, to be managed by the United States Forest Service (USFS). The growing popularity of the automobile, construction of paved highways, and promotion of tourism by boosters from Grants Pass led to large increases in cave visitation during the late 1920s and thereafter. Among the attractions at the remote monument is the Oregon Caves Chateau, a six-story hotel built in a rustic style in 1934. It is a National Historic Landmark and is part of the Oregon Caves Historic District within the monument. The NPS, which assumed control of the monument in 1933, offers tours of the cave from mid-April through early November. At the same time, the segment of the creek that flows through the cave was renamed for the mythological Styx and added to the National Wild and Scenic Rivers System.

The parent rock was originally limestone that metamorphosed to marble during the geologic processes that created the Klamath Mountains, including the Siskiyous. Although the limestone formed about 190 million years ago, the cave itself is no older than a few million years. Valued as a tourist cave, the cavern also has scientific value; sections of the cave that are not on tour routes contain fossils of national importance.

Activities at the park include cave touring, hiking, photography, and wildlife viewing. Lodging and food are available at The Chateau and in Cave Junction. Camping is available in the preserve at the Cave Creek Campground, at a local USFS campground, and private sites in the area.

Geography

Oregon Caves National Monument and Preserve is in the Siskiyou Mountains, a coastal range that is part of the Klamath Mountains of northwestern California and southwestern Oregon.

In December 2014 as part of the National Defense Authorization Act for Fiscal Year 2015, the U.S. Congress enlarged the protected area that includes the cave and changed its name from Oregon Caves National Monument to Oregon Caves National Monument and Preserve.

Eight separate smaller caves have also been discovered in the monument.

Runoff from the heavily wooded monument forms small headwater streams of the Illinois River, a major tributary of the Rogue River. One of five small springs in the monument becomes Upper Cave Creek, which flows on the surface before disappearing into its bed and entering the cave. Supplemented by water entering the cave from above, the stream emerges from the main entrance as Cave Creek. Within the cave, Cave Creek is known as the River Styx, named for the river Styx of Greek mythology connecting Earth to the Underworld. In late 2014, Congress added the River Styx to the National Wild and Scenic Rivers System, which added a level of protection aimed at keeping the stream free-flowing in perpetuity. It is the only subterranean river in the Wild Rivers system.

History
Archeologists believe the first humans to inhabit the Rogue River region were nomadic hunters and gatherers. Radiocarbon dating suggests that they arrived in southwestern Oregon at least 8,500 years ago. At least 1,500 years before the first contact with whites, the natives established permanent villages along streams. Even so, no evidence has been found to suggest that any of the native peoples, such as the Takelma who lived along the Rogue and Applegate rivers in the 19th century, used the cave.

Largely bypassed by the early non-native explorers, fur traders, and settlers because of its remote location, the region attracted newcomers in quantity when prospectors found gold near Jacksonville in the Rogue River valley in 1851. This led to the creation of Jackson County in 1852 and, after gold discoveries near Waldo in the Illinois River valley, the creation of Josephine County, named for the daughter of a gold miner. Even with an influx of miners and of settlers who farmed donation land claims, Josephine County's population was only 1,204 in 1870.

Elijah Jones Davidson, who discovered the cave in 1874, had emigrated from Illinois to Oregon with his parents, who eventually settled along Williams Creek in Josephine County.

Only a few people visited the cave during the next decade. Among them was Thomas Condon, professor of geology at the University of Oregon. Guided by Davidson's brother, in 1884 he and a group of students hiked from Williams to the cavern, which they inspected by candlelight. Shortly thereafter, Walter Burch, an acquaintance of the Davidson family, tried to develop the cave as a business. Burch and his partners opened what they called Limestone Caves and charged visitors $1 each for a guided cave trip, a camping spot, pasture for horses, and cave water they described as medicinal. Although Burch and others hacked crude trails to the cave from Cave Junction and Williams, the trip was too difficult for most tourists, and Limestone Caves ceased operations in 1888.

In the early 1890s, the Oregon Caves Improvement Company, headed by Alfonso B. Smith of San Diego and two men from Kerby, Oregon, tried to raise capital for a larger tourist business at Oregon Caves. Smith succeeded in wooing The San Francisco Examiner, which twice sent reporters to the site. On the second visit, there was "an orgy of destruction" in which passages were widened, formations broken or deliberately removed, and directional arrows added to the cave walls. After Smith had spent all of the company's money and borrowed more in its name, he disappeared in 1894, and the business collapsed.

Neither Burch nor Smith had owned the cave or the land around it, which belonged to the public. Beginning in the 1890s, the Federal government began regulating the use of public lands like these. In 1903, President Theodore Roosevelt designated millions of acres of forest lands for protection, including what became Siskiyou National Forest, which surrounds the cave. The USFS was created in 1905 to manage these reserves. Three years later, Congress passed the Antiquities Act, which allowed the President to designate protected areas called National Monuments on public lands. In 1909, President William Howard Taft established Oregon Caves National Monument, to be managed by the USFS. A year later the USFS employed men to guard the cave and to serve as tour guides.

Isolated and difficult to reach, the monument initially attracted few visitors, by 1920 only 1,800 for the year. The situation changed markedly when large numbers of Americans began to travel by automobile on roads paid for largely with government funds. One highway connected Grants Pass with the California coast at Crescent City. Another new road, the Oregon Caves Highway, led from the Grants Pass – Crescent City highway to the cave. Campaigns to attract car-driving tourists included those of the Cavemen, a booster group from Grants Pass that dressed in animal skins, posed along tour routes, and staged annual events to promote the monument. By 1928, the number of visitors to the cave had risen to about 24,000 a year.

The visitors' need for overnight lodging led to creation of public and private campsites and rustic cabins along highways near Cave Junction and the monument. In 1923, the USFS signed a contract with the Oregon Caves Company, based in Grants Pass, to run the cave tours and improve the park accommodations. Public-private partnerships between the USFS or NPS and concessionaires continued in various forms at Oregon Caves into the 21st century. The Chalet, a building with a kitchen, dining room, gift shop, ticket sales area, and a dormitory for women on the Oregon Caves Company staff, was completed later that year. Three years later, the company added seven two-bedroom cabins for tourists and a dormitory for male employees. In 1928, an Oregon Caves bill written by the USFS and introduced by Senator Charles McNary of Oregon won Congressional approval. It provided funds for electric lights, a power plant, a system of pipes and hoses to wash mud from the cave, and an artificial exit tunnel to eliminate the crowding that occurred when two groups on round-trip tours had to pass one another. The  tunnel was completed in 1931.

Management of the monument was transferred from the Forest Service to the NPS in 1933, and a six-story hotel, the Oregon Caves Chateau, was completed at the site in 1934. Gust Lium, a builder from Grants Pass, oversaw construction of the Chateau and some of the park's other buildings, which he designed in a rustic style. Mason Manufacturing of Los Angeles produced the Chateau's furniture in a style called Monterey, valued in the 21st century at up to $5,000 for a single chair.  During the 1930s and early 1940s, the Civilian Conservation Corps (CCC) installed water and telephone lines, improved trails, and worked on landscaping at the park. The Chalet was rebuilt in 1942 to include a third story and a larger dormitory for women.

Although the Chateau suffered $100,000 in damage from a 1964 flood, it was repaired. By 1968, a total of one million people had visited the cave. In 1987, the Chateau was declared a National Historic Landmark, and in 1992,  of the monument, including the Chateau and other rustic structures, were listed as the Oregon Caves Historic District on the National Register of Historic Places. In 2001, the NPS began running the cave tours formerly offered by private contractors, and two years later all the structures at the monument became public property managed by the NPS. The Illinois Valley Community Development Organization (IVCDO), a non-profit organization based in Cave Junction, runs the monument's gift shop.

In 2014, the protected area was expanded by  that was transferred from the Rogue River – Siskiyou National Forest to create the National Monument and Preserve. The preserve consists of forest, subalpine meadows, mountains, and creeks formerly managed by the USFS and now by the NPS. Named features within the addition include Mount Elijah, Bigelow Lake, and a network of existing trails linked to the monument trails. Although hunting is allowed in the preserve but not in the monument, the new arrangement seeks to end cattle grazing in the Cave Creek – River Styx watershed.

Geology and paleontology

Most caves created from dissolved rocks are formed in limestone or dolomite, but Oregon Caves was formed in marble. Of the more than 3,900 cave systems managed by the NPS, only those in Oregon Caves National Monument and Preserve, Kings Canyon National Park, and Great Basin National Park have marble caves.

The parent rock in which the cave developed was formed about 190 million years ago as limestone that was part of a tectonic plate beneath the Pacific Ocean. Granitic plutons intruded this part of the ocean crust, the Applegate terrane, about 160 million years ago. As the oceanic crust carrying the terrane subducted under the North American plate, the terrane accreted onto the North American Plate and the limestone was subjected to heat and pressure that metamorphosed it to marble.

The cave's creation took place long after the marble formed. As groundwater seeped into cracks in the marble, it eventually dissolved enough rock to expand some of the cracks to the size of tunnels. Generally, the age of a cave cannot be determined directly because the cave itself is an empty space, but scientists can sometimes determine the age of speleothems or sediments in a cave. An early 21st-century study of speleothem development in Oregon Caves focused on the past 380,000 years. Based on the available evidence, the cave is thought to be at least a million years old and "probably not much older than a few million" years.

Marble has a more coarse-grained texture than limestone, but both are made of calcite. Caves often develop when slightly acidic groundwater dissolves calcite along natural fractures in the rock. A reversal of the dissolving process can create flowstone and dripstone such as stalactites, which hang from cave ceilings like icicles, and stalagmites, cone-shaped masses that form on cave floors, usually directly below stalactites. These structures form when acidic groundwater with a high concentration of dissolved calcite drips slowly from the ceiling of an air-filled cave, becomes less acidic, and leaves some of its calcite behind as a solid precipitate. Oregon Caves includes a variety of cave formations created through precipitation of calcite. Although many of the speleothems in the public sections of the cave have been broken, discolored by human skin oils, or otherwise damaged, the narrow twisting passages of the "show cave" have been largely preserved.

The cave is not pure marble. Streams have deposited silts and gravels from the surface. Dikes of diorite, an igneous rock that was part of a pluton, and shales and sandstones, sedimentary rocks interbedded with the marble, are part of the cave.  

The monument has more than 50 paleontological sites ranging in age from Late Pleistocene to Holocene. A fossil of a grizzly bear more than 50,000 years old and a jaguar fossil between 40,000 and 20,000 years old have been found in the cave. Other fossils include amphibians, and rare finds of the mountain beaver and the blue grouse. The monument's
mammalian fossils, found in non-public sections of the cave, are of national significance.

Climate
The park's nearness to the ocean contributes to its relatively mild climate. Annual precipitation, arriving mostly as wet snow, averages . Moderate winds are common.

Flora and fauna

Located within the Klamath–Siskiyou region, known for its high biodiversity, the monument supports 391 vascular plant species as well as many species of bryophyte, lichen, and macrofungi. Trees in the monument include Douglas fir, oak, white fir, and alder. Among the oldest trees is Big Tree, thought to be the widest Douglas fir in the state. The monument contains no plants with special conservation status.

Species lists for the park include about 50 mammals, 86 birds, 11 reptiles and amphibians, 8 bats, more than 200 arthropods, 8 snails and slugs, 75 butterflies, more than 55 moths, and 8 aquatic macroinvertebrates. Of these species, 160 are found inside the cave. Outside the cave, the black-tailed deer, Steller's jay, the common raven, and Townsend's chipmunk are among animals often seen in the park. Less commonly sighted are the black bear, cougar, northern flying squirrel, and Pacific giant salamander. Springs and other wet places support flatworms, frogs, and snails.

Animal species in the park with special conservation status are the northern spotted owl, California mountain kingsnake, tailed frog, Del Norte salamander, northern goshawk, olive-sided flycatcher, little willow flycatcher, Siskiyou gazelle beetle, and Pacific fisher. Five at-risk bat species are found in the cave: Townsend's big-eared bat, and the long-eared, fringed, long-legged, and Yuma myotis.

Recreation and lodging

Oregon Caves National Monument and Preserve is open year-round, although snow sometimes blocks the road to the park, and the visitor center is open when the cave is open for tours. Cave tours are usually offered from mid-April to early November, but the schedule depends in spring and fall on weather conditions. The Illinois Valley Visitor Center in Cave Junction, managed by the IVCDO under an NPS contract, also has information about the cave.

Cave-tour tickets are available online through the Recreation.gov website, and a limited number of tour tickets may sometimes be had first-come, first-served. Tours vary in length and duration. The NPS offers a limited number of off-trail "introduction to caving" tours by reservation only.

Since the cave is only  inside regardless of the outdoor temperature, the NPS recommends warm clothing for its tours. Good walking shoes are needed to negotiate slippery and uneven surfaces. Not allowed on the tours are flashlights, backpacks, large purses, tripods, or pets. To protect bats from white nose syndrome, visitors must not take any clothing or equipment into Oregon Caves that have previously entered any other cave or mine.

Lodging is available in the monument at the Chateau, which has 23 rooms to rent. Several hiking trails wind through the monument and adjacent forest lands. Two short side trails lead from the main trail to waterfalls along No Name Creek. Other named trails entering the park include Cave Creek, Mt. Elijah, and Limestone. In 2012, the Oregon Caves Historic District was expanded to include several segments of the trail system.

Hotels, bed and breakfasts, motels, and resorts in the vicinity offer a variety of accommodations. Although no camping is allowed in the monument, the NPS maintains the Cave Creek Campground within the preserve. Additionally, the USFS maintains a campground nearby, and there are private campgrounds and recreational vehicle parks in the vicinity. The Chateau, generally open from early May to late October, has a restaurant, coffee shop, and delicatessen, and Cave Junction has several restaurants. The monument grounds include several picnic tables.

See also
 List of national monuments of the United States

Notes

References

Sources

External links

 Friends of Oregon Caves and Chateau
 Oregon Caves National Monument – The Oregon Encyclopedia
 Webcam – real-time view from the main visitor center

1909 establishments in Oregon
Caves of Oregon
Civilian Conservation Corps in Oregon
Landforms of Josephine County, Oregon
Limestone caves
National Park Service National Monuments in Oregon
Protected areas established in 1909
Protected areas of Josephine County, Oregon
Show caves in the United States
National Preserves of the United States